William I (22 March 875 – 6 July 918), called the Pious, was the Count of Auvergne from 886 and Duke of Aquitaine from 893, succeeding the Poitevin ruler Ebalus Manser. He made numerous monastic foundations, most important among them the foundation of Cluny Abbey on 11 September 910.

Life
William was son of Bernard Plantapilosa and Ermengard. Sometime before 898, William married the Bosonid Angilberga, daughter of Boso of Provence and Ermengard of Italy.

By inheritance, William was the ruler of Auvergne and the Limousin. He conquered Poitou and Aquitaine in 893 on behalf of Ebalus Manser. He kept the latter for himself and was proclaimed duke. His possessions extended from Austrasia to Toulouse and included the Autunois and Mâconnais.

In 909, William founded the Benedictine abbey of Cluny that would become an important political and religious centre. William required no control over the abbey, which he arranged should be responsible directly to the pope (see Clunian reforms). This was especially striking since most monasteries were privately owned and the appointment of abbots and officials was left to that family or individual, leading to the appointment of untrained and unordained abbots and officials.  William also nominated Cluny's first abbot, Berno of Baume.

A sign of William's independence of rule in Aquitaine is that he had a deniers minted in his own name at Brioude. He was buried in the monastery of Saint-Julien. William had no sons of his own and was succeeded by a nephew, William the Younger, son of his sister Adelinda.

Marriage and issue
William married Angilberga and they had:
Boso, predeceased his father

See also
Dukes of Aquitaine family tree

References

Sources

Nouvelle Biographie Générale. Paris, 1859.
Rouche, Michel. "Private life conquers state and society," in A History of Private Life, Vol. I, Paul Veyne, ed. Harvard University Press, 1987. 

875 births
918 deaths
Dukes of Aquitaine
Counts of Auvergne
9th-century people from West Francia
10th-century people from West Francia
Founders of Christian monasteries